Princeton R-V School District is a school district headquartered in Princeton, Missouri. It operates an elementary school and a combined junior and senior high school.

The majority of the district is in Mercer County, and includes Princeton and southern portions of Ravanna. Small portions are in Grundy County.

History
In 1983 both the Coca-Cola and Pepsi companies lobbied to get the rights to have their drinks sold at school district events. The district previously used Pepsi, which offered to give $800 to an organization related to the district, but the district selected Coca-Cola, which offered to fund two annual scholarships, worth $200 each, and to give the district a new scoreboard for athletic games.

In 2006 the district proposed a school bond, and voters approved it with six being the margin of victory. The bond had a value of $3,000,000.

Athletics
In 2005 the district made a sports team sharing arrangement with the North Mercer School District, so Princeton handles American football for both districts while North Mercer handles boys' softball.

References

External links
 
School districts in Missouri
Education in Grundy County, Missouri
Mercer County, Missouri